Avenida de Mayo is a station on Line C of the Buenos Aires Underground.  From here, passengers may transfer to Lima Station on Line A and Metrobus 9 de Julio. The station was opened on 9 November 1934 as part of the inaugural section of the line, from Constitución to Diagonal Norte.

Gallery

References

External links

Buenos Aires Underground stations
Railway stations opened in 1934
1934 establishments in Argentina